Eunoe abyssorum is a scale worm first described in 1885. The type locality is in the Great Australian Bight, which is south of mainland Australia.

Description
Number of segments 35–40; elytra 15 pairs. Violet-coloured prostomium. Anterior margin of prostomium with an acute anterior projection. Lateral antennae inserted ventrally (beneath prostomium and median antenna). Notochaetae distinctly thicker than neurochaetae. Bidentate neurochaetae absent.

References

Phyllodocida
Animals described in 1885